Alteripontixanthobacter muriae is a bacterium from the genus of Alteripontixanthobacter.

References

Sphingomonadales
Bacteria described in 2021